George R. Redfield (October 6, 1796October 29, 1887) was a Michigan politician.

Early life
George R. Redfield was born in Suffield, Connecticut on October 6, 1796, to parents Peleg and Mary Polly Redfield. Around 1821, George owned a farm in Clifton Springs, New York. George had this farm leased while he tutored in Georgia from 1822 to 1826.

Career
In 1834, Redfield purchased around 800 acres of land in what is now known as Adamsville, Michigan. Redfield moved to Michigan in 1835. On November 2, 1840, Redfield was elected to the Michigan House of Representatives where he represented the Cass and Van Buren County district from January 4, 1841, to April 13, 1841. On November 1, 1841, Redfield was elected to the Michigan Senate where he represented the 5th district after being sworn in on January 3, 1842. Redfield continued to represent this district until May 12, 1844. In 1844, Redfield served as a presidential elector. Redfield served as Michigan State Treasurer from 1845 to 1846. Redfield served as Michigan Secretary of State in 1850. Redfield resigned from this position on April 11, 1850. Again in 1850, Redfield served as a delegate to the Michigan constitutional convention.

Personal life
On June 9, 1835, Redfield married Julia Augusta Mason. He was widowed upon her death on August 29, 1848. Redfield remarried on September 14, 1854, to Jane E. Hammond. Redfield had three children by his first wife, and two by his second.

Death
Redfield died on October 29, 1887, in Ontwa Township, Michigan. Redfield is interred at Gods Half Acre Cemetery in Edwardsburg, Michigan.

References

1796 births
1887 deaths
Farmers from Michigan
Farmers from New York (state)
1844 United States presidential electors
People from Suffield, Connecticut
People from Cass County, Michigan
Burials in Michigan
Democratic Party members of the Michigan House of Representatives
Democratic Party Michigan state senators
Secretaries of State of Michigan
State treasurers of Michigan
19th-century American politicians